Yanet is a feminine given name. Notable people with the name include:

 Yanet Bermoy (born 1987), Cuban judoka
 Yanet Cruz (born 1988), Cuban javelin thrower
 Yanet Núñez Mojarena (born 1981), Cuban tennis player
 Yanet Seyoum (born 1994), Ethiopian swimmer
 Yanet Sovero (born 1983), Peruvian freestyle wrestler

See also
 Janet (given name)

Feminine given names
Spanish feminine given names